At the 1994 FIFA World Cup, Brazil participated for the 15th time in the event. The country remained as the only national team to have participated in every installment of the FIFA World Cup. Brazil reached the final where they defeated Italy on penalties.

Squad
Head coach:  Carlos Alberto Parreira

Matches

Brazil vs Russia

Brazil vs Cameroon

Brazil vs Sweden

Brazil vs United States

Netherlands vs Brazil

Sweden vs Brazil

Final

References

External links
1994 World Cup Final Video

 
Countries at the 1994 FIFA World Cup